Spartak Junost are a junior-level synchronized skating team from Yekaterinburg, Russia. They are 2017 and 2018 World Junior Synchronized Skating Championships gold medalist. They have also won bronze medal at the 2013 World Junior Synchronized Skating Championships, held in Helsinki, Finland.

Competitive results

Seasons 2012–18

References

Junior synchronized skating teams
Sports teams in Russia
Figure skating in Russia
World Junior Synchronized Skating Championships medalists